Ryan (formerly known as Devar ("Devair" as a misprint)) is an unincorporated community in Inyo County, California that is now privately owned and stewarded by the Death Valley Conservancy.

Name

The mining community of Lila C was constructed in 1907 near the Lila C mine, which produced colemanite for the Pacific Coast Borax Company. The town was named by its owner William Tell Coleman, after his daughter, Lila C. Coleman. Soon after its completion, the community of Lila C became known as "Ryan", in honor of John Ryan (18491918), who was General Manager of the Pacific Coast Borax Company and a trusted employee of "Borax" Smith until his death in 1918. The Ryan post office was opened at Lila C in 1907.

When a new mining camp was first constructed  to the northwest in 1914, the new settlement was named Devar (misspelled as Devair on a 1930 topographic map) an acronym for DEath VAlley Railroad.  The name was later changed to Ryan in honor of John Ryan and the old camp at the Lila C.  The new camp is currently known as Ryan, CA or Ryan Camp.

History
Ryan was the western terminus for the Death Valley Railroad, the eastern terminus of which was located at Death Valley Junction near the borax works of the Pacific Coast Borax Company in the early 20th century.

According to the Death Valley Conservancy, "Ryan was a luxurious mining camp by any standards of the day – with electricity, steam heat and refrigeration it also boasted a school, a hospital, post office, recreation hall/church (shipped down in sections from Rhyolite) and a general store."

After borax production had stopped in 1928, in an effort to increase revenues on the Tonopah and Tidewater Railroad which had carried the borax ore, Pacific Coast Borax converted the miners' lodgings into tourist accommodations and gave tourists visiting Death Valley trips on the narrow gauge rail line into the mine. The Death Valley View Hotel operated full-time from 1927 until 1930, the year the Death Valley Railroad ceased to function.  After 1930 the hotel was used as overflow accommodations for the Furnace Creek Ranch and Inn through the 1950s.

The Death Valley Conservancy is the current caretaker of Ryan Camp. The donation of Ryan Camp to the Death Valley Conservancy was completed by Rio Tinto Borax Corporation on May 6, 2013. The Death Valley Conservancy is a nonprofit charity led by the former Rio Tinto Chief Executive of Energy & Minerals, Preston Chiaro, as the DVC's President.

Tours 
While Ryan is closed to the general public for safety and historic preservation reasons, the Death Valley Conservancy offers occasional public tours. Tour participants can be selected by signing up on the Death Valley Conservancy's website.

Climate
This area has a large amount of sunshine year round due to its stable descending air and high pressure.  According to the Köppen climate classification system, Ryan has a desert climate, abbreviated "Bwh" on climate maps.

References

Ghost towns in Inyo County, California
Mining communities in California
Populated places in the Mojave Desert
Unincorporated communities in Inyo County, California
History of the Mojave Desert region
History of Inyo County, California
Tonopah and Tidewater Railroad
Unincorporated communities in California
Company towns in California